is a Japanese judoka.

He was born in Ōbu, Aichi, and began judo at the age of a first grader.

After graduating from Tokai University, He entered the Sohgo Security Services. He won a gold medal at the -71 kg category of the Asian Championships in 1993 and silver medal at Asian Games in 1994. .

Toyama retired in 1996 and as of 2009, Toyama coaches judo at his alma mater, Doho high school, where he previously studied as an undergraduate.

Achievements
1988 - All-Japan Junior Championships (-71 kg) 1st
 - Inter-highschool championships (-71 kg) 5th
1990 - All-Japan Junior Championships (-71 kg) 1st
1992 - Jigoro Kano Cup (-71 kg) 3rd
 - Hamburg Super World Cup (-71 kg) 3rd
 - All-Japan Selected Championships (-71 kg) 2nd
 - Kodokan Cup (-71 kg) 3rd
1993 - Asian Championships (-71 kg) 1st
 - All-Japan Selected Championships (-71 kg) 3rd
 - Kodokan Cup (-71 kg) 3rd
1994 - Asian Games (-71 kg) 2nd
 - Jigoro Kano Cup (-71 kg) 3rd
 - Super World Cup Hamburg
 - All-Japan Selected Championships (-71 kg) 1st
 - Kodokan Cup (-71 kg) 1st

References

1970 births
Living people
Tokai University alumni
Japanese male judoka
Sportspeople from Aichi Prefecture
People from Ōbu, Aichi
Asian Games medalists in judo
Judoka at the 1994 Asian Games
Asian Games silver medalists for Japan
Medalists at the 1994 Asian Games
20th-century Japanese people
21st-century Japanese people